Kingston Bridge may refer to:

 Kingston Bridge (Kingston, New Jersey), a bridge across the Millstone River in New Jersey, U.S.
 Kingston Bridge, Glasgow, a bridge across the River Clyde in Glasgow, Scotland
 Kingston Bridge, London, a bridge across the River Thames in Kingston upon Thames, England
Kingston Railway Bridge
 Kingston-Rhinecliff Bridge, a bridge across the Hudson River in New York, U.S.
 Kingston on Murray Bridge, a crossing of the Murray River, Australia